Canada competed at the 2004 Summer Olympics in Athens, Greece, from 13 to 29 August 2004. Canadian athletes have competed in every Summer Olympic Games since 1900, except the 1980 Summer Olympics in Moscow because of the country's support for the US-led boycott.

The Canadian Olympic Committee sent a total of 263 athletes, 130 men and 133 women, to take part in 28 sports.  This was the nation's smallest delegation to the Games, since the nation boycotted the games in 1980. This had become a result of the COC changing its qualification standards, after a reduced medal showing at the 2000 Summer Olympics in Sydney, with the aim of sending fewer athletes but focusing its energy on those who have the best chance at winning medals. It has been suggested that the "logical response" of winning fewer medals was diverting funding away from sports where Canadians struggled (track and field) to ones where Canadians excelled (kayak and diving). Athletes that qualified for the Olympics would not be sent to Athens unless they had finished in the top twelve worldwide, a policy that was widely criticized as numerous Canadian Olympic medallists in past Games would have been excluded by such criteria. Over 50 Canadian athletes, including two-time Olympian marathoner Bruce Deacon, did not make the COC's "top 12" cutoff despite achieved the international qualifying standards in their respective sports. After 2004 the COC scrapped this policy but still maintains additional hurdles beyond international standards to ensure that athletes are in shape for the Olympics.

Canada left Athens with a total of 12 medals (3 golds, 6 silver, and 3 bronze), the lowest in Summer Olympic history since 1988. Canada's overall medal count had been dropping in the recent editions of the Summer Olympics, along with the totals for most developed countries as the developing nations capture comparatively more medals. Many expected Canada to win a similar number of medals as they did in 2000. Most of these medals were awarded to the athletes in canoeing, cycling, diving, and gymnastics. Sprint kayaker Adam van Koeverden became the most decorated athlete of the Games with two Olympic medals, including a gold in the men's K-1 500 m.

The flag bearer was two-time Olympic medallist Nicolas Gill, a judoka. A mild controversy developed after it was revealed that Gill had made comments in favour of Quebec separatism, and had voted yes in the 1995 Quebec referendum. Gill went on to lose his opening match and was eliminated from the tournament, which was seen as symbolic of Canada's 2004 Olympic woes.

Medallists

|  style="text-align:left; width:72%; vertical-align:top;"|

|  style="text-align:left; width:23%; vertical-align:top;"|

Archery 

Two Canadian archers qualified each for the men's and women's individual archery.

Men

Athletics 

Canadian athletes have so far achieved qualifying standards in the following athletics events (up to a maximum of 3 athletes in each event at the 'A' Standard, and 1 at the 'B' Standard). The team was selected based on the results of the 2004 Canadian Olympic Trials.

Men
Track & road events

Field events

Women
Track & road events

Field events

Badminton 

Women

Mixed

Baseball 

Canada's baseball team did very well in the initial stages of the round-robin winning their four first games. Despite losses to Japan and Cuba, they rebounded in their final game vs. Australia. Most notable has been the performance of second baseman Richard "Stubby" Clapp.

With a 5-2 record in the preliminary round, Canada finished in 3rd position, behind Japan and Cuba and ahead of Australia. In the semi-finals on August 24, Canada lost 8-5 to Cuba. Canada was leading Cuba 3-2 going into the bottom of the eighth inning but then gave up 6 runs. The game ended in dramatic fashion when Canadian Kevin Nicholson almost hit a game tying homer in the 9th. However, a heavy wind was blowing in from left field that night, which caused the ball to come down inches from the wall and was caught. Japan lost 1-0 to Australia in a surprising result in the other semifinal, almost ruining Canada's hopes for a medal in Baseball, which would later prove true as Canada lost to Japan on August 25 in the Bronze medal game, thereby finishing fourth.

Roster

Manager: 12 – Ernie Whitt

Coaches: 42 – Denis Boucher, 7 – Marty Lehn, 10 – Greg Hamilton, 21 – Tim Leiper.

Round robin

Semifinal

Bronze Medal Game

Boxing 

Boxing had witnessed much controversy over the COC higher qualifying standards. After an appeal it was decided that three more boxers could go to Athens. Canada's most notable success was Benoit Gaudet defeat of Thai former champion Somluck Kamsing and Andrew Kooner who made it to the quarter-final in the Bantamweight class.

Canoeing

Slalom

Sprint
Men

Women

Qualification Legend: Q = Qualify to final; q = Qualify to semifinal

Cycling

Road
Men

Women

Track
Sprint

Time trial

Mountain biking

Diving

Canadian divers qualified for seven individual spots at the 2004 Olympic Games.

Men

Women

Equestrian

Dressage

Eventing

"#" indicates that the score of this rider does not count in the team competition, since only the best three results of a team are counted.

Show jumping

Fencing

Men

Women

Gymnastics

Artistic
Prior to 2004, Canada had never won an Olympic medal in artistic gymnastics, and hopes for a first seemed to be dashed when the main medal threat, double World Championships bronze medallist Kyle Shewfelt suffered an ankle injury in March. By the Games, though, Shewfelt's injury had healed to the point where it did not adversely affect his performance.

Men
Team

Individual finals

Women
Team

Individual finals

Trampoline

Judo

Six Canadian judoka (two men and four women) qualified for the 2004 Summer Olympics.

Men

Women

Modern pentathlon

Two Canadian athletes qualified to compete in the modern pentathlon event.

Rowing

Canada's most heralded team going into Athens was its rowers, and there was considerable hope for success by Canadians with expectations of three medals or more. While the Canadians did well, with a number of finals appearances, only one group won medals the men's fours of Cam Baerg, Jake Wetzel, Thomas Herschmiller and Barney Williams won the silver medal in the men's four rowing final, losing to Great Britain by only 0.08 seconds.

Most disappointing was the men's eights who had been undefeated for two years before the Olympics, but to the surprise of many finished fifth in their event.

Controversy broke out over the rowing team of Dave Calder and Chris Jarvis who were disqualified from the men's pairs semifinal race for entering another team's lane, and thus failed to qualify for the final. The COC appealed the decision, but it was upheld.

Men

Women

Qualification Legend: FA=Final A (medal); FB=Final B (non-medal); FC=Final C (non-medal); FD=Final D (non-medal); FE=Final E (non-medal); FF=Final F (non-medal); SA/B=Semifinals A/B; SC/D=Semifinals C/D; SE/F=Semifinals E/F; R=Repechage

Sailing

Canadian sailors have qualified one boat for each of the following events.

Men

Women

Open

M = Medal race; OCS = On course side of the starting line; DSQ = Disqualified; DNF = Did not finish; DNS= Did not start; RDG = Redress given

Shooting 

Two Canadian shooters qualified to compete in the following events:

Women

Softball

The Canadian softball team finished the preliminary round with the same record as China, but had lost to China 4-2 in head-to-head play and therefore received 5th place and did not advance to the semifinals while China placed 4th and moved on.

Team Roster

Preliminary round

Swimming

For the first time in decades Canada did not win a single medal in swimming. This led to calls for the resignation of head coach Dave Johnson by a number of former swimmers, most notably Barcelona gold medallist Mark Tewksbury. Swim Canada focused on personal bests rather than medals, but even by that measure Canada fared poorly. This lack of medals also stood in sharp contrast to Canada's sibling dominion Australia which won many medals in swimming, as they did in Sydney. There were a few bright spots, including Rick Say making it to the finals of the 200 m freestyle, considered by many to be the premier event of the 2004 Olympics, and a number of Canadian records were set.  Generally though, performances by the swim team were slower than the times they had swum at Canadian Olympic trials 2 weeks before.

Rick Say created a minor controversy after the 4×200-metre freestyle relay immediately in the post-race interview which was aired live on national television, when he said that he was "pissed off at not being able to make up for my teammates' mistakes". The other three team members - Brent Hayden, Brian Johns, and Andrew Hurd - expressed disappointment not in the effort, which broke the Canadian record by over 3.5 seconds, but only in the 5th-place finish which was out of the medals.

Men

Women

Synchronized swimming

Nine Canadian synchronized swimmers qualified a spot in the women's team.

Table tennis

Four Canadian table tennis players qualified for the following events.

Taekwondo

Two Canadian taekwondo jin qualified for the following events.

Tennis

Canadian Tennis Association nominated two male tennis players to compete in the tennis tournament.

Triathlon

Canada had a strong triathlon program, including the defending men's gold medallist Simon Whitfield, who won surprisingly in Sydney. The women's race was something of a disappointment, as top-ranked Canadian Jill Savege, who came out of the water in fifth place, crashed in the bicycle stage and only finished 39th. The two other Canadian women did not fare much better. In the men's triathlon a day later Whitfield finished a respectable 11th.

Volleyball

Beach

Water polo 

Canada's women's water polo team fared poorly, despite beating the number one ranked team from the United States during the round robin. Losing the other two games in the preliminary round put Canada in last place in the pool and eliminated the team from medal contention.  They would end up finishing seventh.

Women's tournament

Roster

Group play

Classification 7th–8th

Weightlifting

Two Canadian weightlifters qualified for the following events:

Wrestling

Men's freestyle

Women's freestyle

Media coverage
The main network for Olympic coverage in Canada is the CBC which covers events live, and then replays highlights in prime time. Both the French and English CBC and Radio-Canada are covering different events. The cable channels TSN & RDS won the rights to broadcast some parts of the games, mostly team sports that CBC and Radio-Canada decided not to cover. The digital channel CBC Country Canada, only available to a minority of Canadians, covered equestrian events.

National outfits
Roots Canada was the official outfitter of clothing for members of the Canadian Olympic team. The same clothing was also sold at Roots stores in Canada. This was the last year for Roots, thereafter HBC was given the contract for official Olympic clothing.

See also

Canada at the 2002 Commonwealth Games
Canada at the 2003 Pan American Games
Canada at the 2004 Summer Paralympics

References

External links
Official Report of the XXVIII Olympiad
Canadian Olympic Team

Nations at the 2004 Summer Olympics
2004
Summer Olympics